José Ignacio Abadal (died 3 May 2010) was a Spanish actor.

He played Eduardo in Investigación criminal (1970), Martin LeRoy in La diligencia de los condenados (1970), both directed by Juan Bosch, and Twenty Paces to Death (1970), directed by Manuel Esteba. He played Vidal Gandolfo alongside Oscar Núñez in Nine Queens (2000).

He died on 3 May 2010 in Barcelona.

Filmography

Films

Television series

References

External links
 

2010 deaths
Male film actors from Catalonia
Male Spaghetti Western actors
Spanish male voice actors
Male stage actors from Catalonia